Sharon Street (born 1973) is a Professor of Philosophy and Chair of the Department of Philosophy at New York University. She specializes in metaethics, focusing in particular on how to reconcile our understanding of normativity with a scientific conception of the world.

Education and career
Street received her B.A. from Amherst College in 1995 and her Ph.D. from Harvard University in 2003 under the supervision of Christine Korsgaard. Street's doctoral dissertation examined the metaethical implications of evolutionary biological explanations of our normative capacities, and whether such explanations might have an undermining effect on our moral and other normative commitments.

Street is currently Professor of Philosophy at New York University. She joined the NYU Philosophy Department in 2002.

Philosophical work

Street's work has been particularly influential in the fields of metaethics, where she defends a doctrine she calls "Humean Constructivism", a term she uses to differentiate her work from the "Kantian Constructivism" of her mentor, Christine Korsgaard. In addition to the development of Humean Constructivism, Street has also been an influential critic of naturalist and non-naturalist accounts of moral realism, as well as quasi-realist and theist metaethical positions.

Bibliography (selected)

References

1973 births
Living people
American philosophers
American women philosophers
New York University faculty
Harvard University alumni
Amherst College alumni
21st-century American women